The 2020 Israel State Cup Final decided the winner of the 2019–20 Israel State Cup, the 84th season of Israel's main football cup. It was played on  13 July 2020 at the Bloomfield Stadium in Tel Aviv, between Maccabi Petah Tikva and Hapoel Be'er Sheva.

Background
Maccabi Petah Tikva had previously played 4 Israel cup Finals, had won the competition a record 2 time. Their most recent appearance in the final was in 2001, in which they lost 3–0 to  Maccabi Tel Aviv, and their most recent victory in the tournament was in 1952, beating Maccabi Tel Aviv 1–0. 

Hapoel Be'er Sheva had previously played in 4 finals, winning one time. Their most recent appearance in the final was in 2015, in which they lost  6–2 to Maccabi Tel Aviv, and their most recent victory in the tournament was in 1997, beating Maccabi Tel Aviv 1–0.

Road to the final

Match

Details

References

Israel State Cup
State Cup
Cup 2020
Israel State Cup matches